Youth Chance, or YCHS, is a small alternative high school for "at-risk" youth in San Francisco, California.

History
Youth Chance High School was founded in 1977 and is run and operated by the YMCA. The school accepts students ages 15 to 19 years old with a focus on students who have dropped out of other schools and whom have subsequently been referred by social service agencies, family members or the students themselves.
The school works with a diverse student population, preparing them with the necessary academic skills to pass the GED and/or CHSPE (California High School Equivalency Exam). 97% of the student body are students of color, and all of the students qualify for free or reduced lunch.

References

High schools in San Francisco
Alternative schools in California
Educational institutions established in 1977
Private high schools in California
1977 establishments in California